Jeffrey A. Joerres served as ManpowerGroup Executive Chairman from 2014–2015, after 15 years as Chief Executive Officer. Having joined the organization in 1993, Joerres served as Vice President of Marketing and Senior Vice President of European Operations and Global Account Management. In 1999, he was named CEO, and in 2001, Chairman of the Board.

His contributions to Manpower led to his recognition in the Institutional Investor magazine which included his name in the list of the Best CEOs in America for the fourth consecutive year.

He has a bachelor’s degree from The Marquette University College of Business Administration.

References

External links
 Profile at SourceWatch

Year of birth missing (living people)
Living people